Augustus Rhodes Sollers (May 1, 1814 – November 26, 1862) was an American politician who represented the seventh congressional district of the state of Maryland from 1841 to 1843, and the sixth congressional district from 1853 to 1855.  He was a member of the Whig Party (United States). He was born near Prince Frederick, Maryland, and was admitted to the bar in 1836.  He served as a member of the State Constitutional Convention of 1851, which drafted and submitted the Maryland Constitution of 1851.  He practiced law until his death in Prince Frederick, and is buried there at St. Paul's Churchyard.

References

External links

 

1814 births
1862 deaths
19th-century American politicians
People from Prince Frederick, Maryland
Whig Party members of the United States House of Representatives from Maryland